Casa Blanca (Spanish for "White House") is a former unincorporated community now an annexed neighborhood of Riverside, in Riverside County, California. It lies at an elevation of 866 feet (264 m).

Notable residents
 Ysmael R. Villegas (1924–1945) – first Medal of Honor recipient from Riverside County, California, now buried at Riverside National Cemetery as the cemetery's first interment.

References

Neighborhoods in Riverside, California